Jamal is a Polish raggamuffin, reggae and dancehall music group from Radom. At various times, it included members Gienia, Księżyc, LUU, EMZK and Siekierka.

The group was founded in 1999 by Łukasz Borowiecki and Tomasz Mioduszewski. The duo started initially as a hip hop band and performed mainly in Polish. The band reformed in 2005 and on June 18 that year, they released a debut album Rewolucje on EMI, with a strong influence of reggae, dancehall and raggamuffin.

Their debut single from the album was "Tubaka" During the annual national Nagroda Muzyczna Fryderyk Awards (known for short as the Fryderyks), their album was nominated for "Best Hip Hop / R&B Album of the Year" in Poland. The band's vocalist Tomasz "Miodu" Mioduszewski credited as Miodu appeared in Molesta's 2006 music video for "Tak miało być" with the single featuring Jamal and charting in Polish Radio official chart Szczecińska Lista Przebojów (SLiP) reaching #31 in addition to hits Policeman (reaching #25) and "Rewolucje" (reaching #29).

Soon after, Frenchman joined from Bass Medium Trinity project working for the follow up album that was released on October 3, 2008, called Urban Discotheque. Frenchman had contributed to the album rendering it was bilingual with some parts sung in French in addition to band singing in Polish.

The band has had a comeback in 2012 with the hit Defto.

Members
 Tomasz "Miodu" Mioduszewski – vocals
 Andrzej "Gienia" Markowski – bass guitar
 Tomasz "Księżyc" Księżopolski – guitar
 Łukasz Wieczorek – guitar
 Radek "Emzk" Ciurko – keyboards
 Bolek Wilczek – percussion
Former members
 Łukasz Borowiecki
 Nicolas "Frenchman" Ribier
 Wojciech "Woocheck" Łuczkiewicz
 Bartek "Głowa" Głowacki

Discography

Studio albums

Singles

Music videos

References

External links
 Jamal MySpace sitel

Polish reggae musical groups
Polish hip hop groups